The twentieth season of the Dutch TV series Wie is de Mol? ("Who is the Mole?") aired in the winter of 2020. This was the second season with Rik van de Westelaken as host. The location of the season was the Henan province in The People's Republic of China, the second time the series had filmed in China, following Hong Kong in season 14. The season premiered on January 11, 2020. While the originally planned Live Finale aired with no audience on March 14, 2020. During the Reunion, Buddy Vedder was declared the winner of the season, earning a grand total of €13,400.-. Vedder, alongside his runner-ups Miljuschka Witzenhausen and Nathan Rutjes, had successfully unmasked Rob Dekay as the Mole.

Format
Followed the same format as its Belgian predecessor, the season had ten Dutch celebrities travel to China to complete Assignments to earn money for the group pot. However, one of the ten is the titular Mole (de Mol), the one designated to sabotage the assignments and cause the group to earn the least amount of money for the winner's pot as possible. Every few days, players would take a 20-question multiple choice test about the identity of the Mole. Once the test is complete, the candidates await their results in an Execution ceremony. The candidate with the worst score is executed from the game, while in the event of the tie the candidate who completed their test the slowest is executed. The season plays out until there are 3 remaining candidates, where they must complete a final test (consisting of 40 questions). The candidate with the highest score, or had completed their test the fastest in a tie, is declared the winner and receives the group's pot.

With the exception of the Black Exemption, that has been included throughout the series since its introduction in Season 14, there were no major twists added to the season. However, after 13 years since Season 7, this season was the second to end with four candidates competing in the Finale to unmask the Mole.

Candidates

Future appearances
Tina de Bruin returned for a special anniversary season Wie is de Mol? Renaissance in September 2020.

Candidates Progress
The order in which the candidates learned their results are indicated in the table below.

 The candidate is the 20th winner of Wie is de Mol.
 The candidate was unmasked as The Mole of the 20th season.
 The candidate was the second place finalist of the 20th season of Wie is de Mol.
 The candidate was the third place finalist of the 20th season of Wie is de Mol.
  The candidate saw a Green Screen to proceeded to the next Episode.
 The candidate used an Exemption to automatically proceed to the next Episode.
 The candidate used a Black Exemption to nullify all Exemptions and Jokers for this test.
 The candidate did not see a Green Screen before the Executed player saw their Red Screen. Thus they proceeded to the next Episode.
 The candidate was executed from the game and sent home.
Notes

Episodes
For more information, see: List of seasons of "Wie is de Mol?" (in Dutch)

Notes

Season Summary

Episode 1 - Afgeschermd

'Wijsheid en Geluk' (Wisdom and Luck)
Rik greets every contestant individually in front of the Hangu Pass. He gives everyone the option to either choose wisdom or luck by going through the left or right gate. Once the contestant has gone through the gate, they got a key and a note with a pattern of Chinese characters. When they went further ahead, they encountered a giant wall with more Chinese characters on it. The contestant then had to match the pattern on their note with the corresponding pattern on the wall. When they found their pattern, they got to open the box underneath, and if it was correct, there was a reward inside for them to keep.

If the contestant chose for luck, they got an 'exemption', which would automatically grant them a spot in the next round when used at the test. If the contestant chose for wisdom, they got a 'black exemption', which would disable all exemptions and jokers when used at any tests before the Finale.

'Beltegoed' (Calling Credit) - Max. €2,500.-
The contestants arrived at a local market in Sanmenxia. Scattered across the market are several tablets with half banknotes on it. The contestants had to make pictures of them and combine them to whole banknotes to earn money. However, they had to use the mobile phones from the locals to take the pictures. Also, only one picture was allowed to be taken on each phone. After 20 minutes, the time is up and all correctly combined banknotes are counted and exchanged to money for the pot.

€150 was earned for the pot.

'Parkeertarief' (Parking Fee) - Max. €2,100.-
The contestants are locked up in duos in the back of five different trucks. They had to free themselves by completing assignments in the truck. The trucks were labeled as '€', '2', '1', '0', and another '0'. When they managed to get out, they had to park the trucks next to each other in such a way, that the numbers form an amount to earn the most money for the pot (€2100).

€20 was earned for the pot.

Episode 2 - Tegendraads

'Kleur Werk' (Color Work) - Max. €2,500.-
The contestants stand before the Sanmenxia Dam. Divided into three duos, and a trio, the contestants had to correctly connect their station's corresponding colour canon (Yellow, Blue, Red, and Green) in half an hour before the Colour show. Every colour that is fired by Rik at the end of the assignment earns €500 for the pot. If the group completed the additional objective of connecting the four stations together, an additional €500 would be added to the pot.

€1,500.- was earned for the pot.

'Afhaal Chinees' (Chinese Takeaway) - Max. €1,750.-
Returning to their hotel in the afternoon, Rik approached the contestants and informed them that they had to collect envelopes throughout Sanmenxia before arriving at dinner with him within an hour and a half time limit. In duos and one solo team, the contestants must ride in taxis with Chinese drivers who cannot speak Dutch or English. Each taxi has a cellphone that the teams can use to help translate instructions to their driver, however, the numbers on the phone would call Chinese Restaurants throughout Amsterdam. If each team arrived at the restaurant with their envelope, they earned money. If they arrived with no envelope, they earn nothing. Whoever arrives late or not at all will cost the group €100 per person.

€100.- was removed from the pot.

'Wereldbeeld' (Worldview) - Max. €2,000.-
With two contestants stationed in the Swan Lake Park's Control room, the group must traverse the park to find pieces of the world map. In communication with the Control room, the contestants must place the world map pieces under the correct security cameras to build a Chinese World Map (A World map with Asia in the center). If the group is successful, €2,000.- is earned for the pot.

The contestants failed the assignment and earned nothing for the pot.

Episode 3 - Welvarend

'Lijn(ver)diensten' (Scheduled Services) - Max. €2,250.-
Arriving at the Yellow River in Zhengzhou, two contestants were tasked to solve a logic problem using three Hovercraft ferries. At 3 stations along the route, their fellow contestants would be waiting with new instructions on how to solve the problem. After 3 laps around the route, the three hovercraft return to the start of the assignment. If the contestants ended up in their correct Hovercraft without breaking any of the rules, the group would earn €2,250.-

The contestants failed the assignment and earned nothing for the pot.

'Beeldig' (Charming/Statue) - Max. €2,000.-
In the square below the Emperors Yan and Huang, the contestants were divided into two groups, two contestants with Keen Eye for Detail, and six contestants with an imagination. Amidst the 107 statues in the Square, four of them had envelopes with money attached to them. The two Keen Eye contestants had to describe the correct statues from photographs to the six Imaginative contestants. The group has 30 minutes to collect the correct envelopes. Incorrect envelopes would contain Minus Money and would be removed from the group's pot.

€600.- was earned for the pot.

'Thee Pot' (Tea Pot) - Max. €2,700.-
Travelling to the county city, Dengfeng, the contestants are shown an ornate tea set during breakfast. After the showing, the contestants are tasked to find each piece of the set spread throughout the Shenhou village, famous for its porcelain ceramics. The group, divided into duos, were provided a list of 9 shop names written in Mandarin where the pieces could be found. If the group were successful in collecting all 9 pieces within half an hour, they would earn €1,500.- for the pot. At the end of the assignment, Rik offered the choice for the group to take the value of the tea set instead of the €1,500.-.

The group chose to turn down Rik's offer and €1,500.- was earned for the pot.

Episode 4 - Misleid

'Porseleinen Kamer' (Porcelain Room) - Max. €2,850.-
In duos, the contestants must navigate themselves through a tightly packed room full of porcelain ceramics. While navigating through the room, each contestant must carry a wooden structure worth various amounts of money. The last contestant to navigate through the room must carry the most difficult wooden structure worth the most money. Any pieces of porcelain that are broken costs the group €75.- each from the pot.

€2,330.- was earned for the pot.

'Verkeer(d)' (Wrong/Traffic) - Max. €2,560.-
In a large parking lot below Fuxi Mountain, were parked 10 vehicles in wrong positions. The group Treasurer was tasked to divide the contestants into three groups,  Two Traffic Guides (who knew the correct license plates and routes for each car), Four Drivers (who could look and drive the vehicles to the correct parking spots), and a Shuttle Driver (who can drive all over the parking lot to drop off the Drivers). Every vehicle parked in their correct spot, as well as driven along the correct route, doubles the amount of money earned in the assignment, starting with €5,- for the first correct vehicle parked.

€320.- was earned for the pot.

'Vrijstellingsroute' (Exemption Route) - Max. €3,500.-
Awaiting their results at the Execution, Rik informed the contestants that they could acquire a Group Exemption and skip this Execution. One by one, the contestants must walk the path they took from writing their test to the seating where the Execution would take place. Along the path were boxes with envelopes with different choices, Money, Jokers, and the Group Exemption. Once they have walked past a box, they cannot go back, and once they have made their choice and delivered it to Rik, they couldn't look at further boxes. If the outright majority of the contestants chose the Group Exemption, the Execution would be cancelled. All money and jokers picked would go to the pot and respective contestants regardless of the outcome.

€1,000.- was earned for the pot.

Episode 5 - Aangeraakt

'Beeld & Geluid' (Image & Sound) - Max. €1,500.-
On center stage in the Luoyang Opera House, stood 6 individual tasks the group had to complete to earn money for the pot. Surrounding each task were lasers that the contestants could not breach or be removed from the assignment all together, however, at random intervals the lasers will open a gap for the candidates to swap themselves out. As there were 7 contestants, one would start the assignment outside of the tasks ready to swap with the others. If no swap is made, the contestant inside is removed from the assignment as well. Each completed task earned €250.- for the pot.

€250.- was earned for the pot.

'Lettergreep' (Syllables) - Max. €1,500.-
Hidden throughout the Guanlinzhen Wholesale Market were giant letters in which the group had to find and bring back to the center of the Market to spell out a sentence. The more letters collected, the more money the group could earn. Divided into three teams, the contestants had 30 minutes to complete the task. After the time limit was reached, the group reassembled in the market square and were instructed to find envelopes that were placed where they found the letters, W, D, M which held money for the pot. However, as the letter W was not found, the group could not look for that letter's envelope.

€600.- was earned for the pot.

'Lezen & Schrijven' (Reading and Writing) - Max. €1,750.-
The contestants spent the morning in the Luoyang Botanical Gardens learning how to write their names in Mandarin, with instructions later on how to write "is the Mole." After the lesson, individually the contestants were approached by Rik with an opportunity to walk through the Gardens to find the Mole or put €250.- into the pot. If the contestant chose to find the Mole through the Gardens, they are given 5 minutes to walk through the park amidst 5 groups of women practicing Tai chi. On one of the fans the women are holding, had the name of the Mole written in Mandarin.

€250.- was earned for the pot.

Episode 6 - Voor geen meter

'Voice Mol' (Voice Mole) - Max. €1,500.-
On a farming field near the White Horse Temple, Rik informed the contestants that hidden in the field are 6 cellphones. The distance between the cellphones in meters forms an 11 digit number in which the group must call to get in contact with Rik. If the group correctly contacts Rik, they successfully complete the assignment. Rik provides a hint by calling the first cellphone. The group were provided a tape measure to record the distances, and 20 minutes to call Rik's phone.

The contestants failed the assignment and earned nothing for the pot.

'Vak Werk' (Box Work) - Max. €2,500.-
The contestants were assigned to 6 large demarcated boxes in a public plaza in Luoyang. Accompanying each contestant were a group of local people from the city. If the contestants and their corresponding group of locals were in the correct composition, they could earn €2,500.-. During the 15 minutes of the assignment, Rik will show the contestants how much their combination is worth. At the end of the assignment, one of the contestants must vacate their box and approach Rik to cash out and find out the final total earned in the assignment. The assignment is a complicated version of Mastermind.

€1,030.- was earned for the pot.

'Alles Kenners' (All the Experts) - Max. €1,500.-

In the village of Weijiapo, an ancient village in the shape of a dragon, the contestants are instructed to enter the village one by one. Inside the village are envelopes with names on it. (These names were the usernames of Wie is de Mol fans in the official fan forums.) For 5 minutes each, the first 5 contestants must report back to the group on the layout of the village and the locations of the envelopes. The group can only map out the village and envelopes using a chalkboard at the entrance. Hidden throughout the village are tubes of sand which is needed for the last contestant's entry into the village. If any of the contestants are not back at the village entrance within 5 minutes, any tubes of sand in their possession is removed from the assignment. Once the last contestant is ready to enter the village, Rik indicates which five envelopes they must collect to earn money, the twist is that all the names have been removed from the envelopes before the last contestant enters the village. The tubes are used for a sand timer as the final time limit. Correct envelopes collected adds money to the pot, while incorrect envelopes removes money from the pot.

€200.- was removed from the pot.

Episode 7 - Tegenstander

'Kleur Rijk' (Colourful) - Max. €1,500.-
In the midst of the local Dayang factory in Luoyang, the group select one contestant to record the group's observations, with special emphasis to the colours they see. Throughout the time limit of 20 minutes, electric cars of various colours drive past the contestants, with various words of colours placed on the backs of each car (which are also in various colours). After the time limit, Rik asks the contestant who wrote down the group's observations three questions about the number of red cars, number of cars with the word 'red' on their back, and how many words were written in red. Each correct answer earned €500.- for the pot.

The contestants failed the assignment and earned nothing for the pot.

'Mol Laser' (Mole Laser) - Max. €1,600.-
The annual laser-game assignment occurred in the early evening in a barrack in the Luoyang. Throughout the barracks are light installations in which the contestants would have to shoot at with a laser gun. For each red light the contestants hit and turn green, they earn €100.- for the pot. However, they will be playing one on one against the Mole, who has to shoot green lights red to remove €100.- from the pot. Each round ends when either the contestant or the Mole is hit by their opponent's laser gun.

The outcome of the assignment will be revealed during the live reunion at the end of the season.

'Scherp Stellen' (Sharp Couples) - Max. €1,500.-
Taken to a tourist theme park in Luoyang, Rik read out a list of 15 photographs the contestants had to take with the locals in the theme park. Some involved a combination of group photos with locals including certain contestants, some with only locals wearing specific outfits, or in specific locations. The contestants had 20 minutes to complete the assignment. Each correct photograph supplied to Rik earned €100.- for the pot.

€400.- was earned for the pot.

'Executie' (Execution)
Before the Execution ceremony began, Rik informed the group that they had an opportunity to avoid viewing their results during this execution. Each contestant had to select between a Red or Green card hidden by Rik. If the contestant chose a Green card, they got to choose someone else who didn't have to see their results screen. If the contestant chose a Red card, they would choose who will see their result screen. The execution game ends if someone sees a Red screen, or if all contestants chosen to see their results screen only see Green; thus everyone proceeding to the next episode.

Episode 8 - Doorgeven

'Kettingreacties' (Chain Reaction) - Max. €1,650.-
Luoyang has a similar bicycle culture that is seen in the Netherlands, and this assignment requires three contestants to ride around Luoyang to find different colour bicycles. The two remaining contestants stay by the map at the starting point and must direct the three cyclists over the phone to the coloured bicycles throughout the city. Starting on blue bicycles, each of the cycles must proceed to swap bicycles in the order of Blue, Orange, White, and lastly Green before returning to the start. The more swaps each cyclist makes, the more money is earned for the pot if the cyclist returns within the 30 minute time limit.

€250.- was earned for the pot.

'Je Draai Vinden' (Find Your Way)
After lunch, the contestants were escorted to a prominent dining venue in Luoyang that Paramount leader Xi Jinping had dined in while visiting the city. Once seated at the table, Rik informed the group that they would be answering 10 questions about their journey so far, with the goal of acquiring the most points. After each question (starting with the contestant that drew first, then clockwise around the table) each contestant is given the choice to keep their answer, or rotate the table until they get the answer they want from another contestant. The contestant with the most points after 10 questions receives an Exemption that they can use for the next Execution. In the event of a tie, the first contestant to break the tie wins the Exemption.

Miljuschka broke the tiebreaker against Nathan and won the Exemption.

'Doorzichtig' (Transparant) - Max. €2,000.-
Taking the morning to drive to the Three Gorges Scenic Area, the contestants were instructed to position themselves along a glass suspension bridge high above the Yellow River.; a common feature in parks around China. Across the bridge stood 6 boxes with tubes in 5 of them. At the beginning of the assignment, the contestants could look once inside the tubes at their corresponding boxes to see the amount of money they held. Once they have looked at their tubes, the group must swap them among themselves to fill five box with three vials to match the € amount on the lid of the box. The boxes increase in amounts from €80.-, to a sixth box valued at €1,200.- that can hold 9 tubes. The group has 20 minutes to complete the assignment, and only boxes with the correct tubes in them would become money for the pot.

€80.- was earned for the pot.

Episode 9 - Sturen

'Cijferkunst' (Figure Art) - Max. €1,750.-
The morning after Leonie's shock Execution, the contestants were taken to the Luoyang Ancient Tombs Museum to witness a Martial Arts demonstration. After the first viewing, Rik revealed that in duos, the group must decipher the number sequence the children in the Martial Arts demonstration are performing, with the help of a number chart. After three more viewings of the demonstration, Rik approached the treasurer, Nathan, and asked if the other duo knew the answer. If the treasurer's judgment is correct, the group would earn €1,750.-.

The contestants failed the assignment and earned nothing for the pot.

'Onder de Pannen?' (Under the Pans?) - Max. N/A

That evening in the Shi Jie Night Market in Luoyang, the contestants were tasked for form duos again between two food carts. They had two hours to prepare, cook, and sell Dutch food to the local marketgoers. For every transaction made, the group earned money for the pot. After the assignment was complete, the group found out that they had 49 successful transactions at €25 per transaction, however, as the game has no €5.- note, the group's winnings were rounded down to the nearest zero.

€1,220.- was earned for the pot.

'Richtingsgevoel?' (Sense of Direction) - Max. €6,000.-

The final assignment took place at the Lijing Gate, where one at a time, the contestants met with Rik for one final offer. Along the top floor of the gate stood 6 doors in which the contestants could check to earn money. However, each contestant had to choose either to risk €500, €1,000, or €1,500 from the pot for the assignment. The Mole's voice is put through software to disguise themselves from the contestants. Once they have made their choice known to Rik, the Mole separates the money between 1 to 3 of the six doors and calls the contestant over the phone to tell them where they hid the money. The contestant must decide after every two doors to believe or distrust the Mole's instructions to check for money. The game continues until either all the money they risked is collected, or if the contestant has checked up to 3 doors of the six doors. Whatever money they managed to retrieve would be doubled and put back into the final pot.

The outcome of the assignment will be revealed during the live reunion at the end of the season.

After the assignment, Rik informed the four contestants that they were indeed the finalists (to their surprise) and to prepare for their final test of the season.

Episode 10 - Finale

Due to the COVID-19 pandemic, the reveal and live finale of Wie is de Mol 2020 had to go on with no audience as a public safety measure. The finalists, Buddy, Miljuschka, Nathan, and Rob were gathered the morning of the Live Finale for the reveal of the Mole and the outcome of the final test back in Luoyang, Henan. With the final test being multiple choice out of 40 questions, in Third place was Nathan with a score of 34. Second place, Miljuschka, totaling up to 37 out of 40. At the announcement that Rob was the Mole, Buddy won the season with a final test score of an outstanding 39 out of 40.

After the reveal of the Mole's identity, it was revealed that Rob managed to remove €300.- from the pot in the Mol Laser assignment. Despite his best efforts, the Finalists managed to earn €2,500.- for the pot during the final assignment, Richtingsgevoel. Leaving a grand total of €13,400 in the winner's pot for Buddy.

Mole Sabotage
Rob's strategy as the Mole was to play up his superfan status of Wie is de Mol on and off camera to the annoyance of the production to throw off his fellow Candidates. His strategy worked as only on the final test did the other Candidates finally chose him as their Moles.

Beltegoed: While the group were scattered throughout the market gathering local Chinese people to use their phones for the assignment, Rob would sabotage the tablets to display lower amounts of money for the group to photograph.

Parkeertarief: Rob was informed that the truck he was locked in with Leonie would cause the group to earn a maximum of €200,- if they did not get out. So he delayed solving their puzzle until the time ran out. Luckily a second truck did not complete their assignment, thus the group only managed to earn €20,- for the assignment.

Beeldig: Rob placed himself in the group that had to search for envelopes in this assignment. His goal was to make sure neither group collected the correct envelopes. Directing his group to incorrect statues as quickly as he could to make sure Minus money would be collected. In one instance he took out money from one of the correct envelopes (and hid it in his hat) to further reduce the group's earnings from the assignment.

Verkeer(d): With Nathan as Treasurer selecting the group's roles in the assignment, Rob lucked out into the Traffic Guide position where he could give false directions over the radio phones to the drivers when he felt like it. In such a powerful position, he managed to make sure to keep the pot low by making sure only 7 out of the 10 cars were correctly driven and parked for a mere €320,-. His poor "Etherdiscipline" aided in delaying and confusing the Candidates further throughout the assignment.

Lettergreep: Aware of which letters had to be found for the second stage of the assignment, Rob ran the first stage as a fanatical candidate and found 4 letters and the Question Mark. As the W was not found, that reduced the potential earning, and during the second stage, he let Leonie take charge in searching for the remaining money without helping behind the scenes.

Voice Mol: While Buddy took charge of the measuring for this assignment, Rob would be on the other end of the measuring tape, pulling the tape further than necessary to fudge the certain distances. Once all the phones were found, he made sure that a certain distance was one meter off to make sure the group never called Rik.

Alles Kenners: Rob volunteered to enter the village first, so that he could switch the correct envelopes with wrong envelopes. Further sabotage was that he searched for the sand vials for the timer and dig holes in the ground to hide them from the group, meaning less time for Nathan to search for the correct envelopes he had already sabotaged.

Mol Laser: Rob managed to hide throughout the laser tag field against most of the candidates, however, when it came down to Nathan's battle against him, Nathan's antics scared Rob until he chose to be taken out instead of being caught and unmasked. In the end of the assignment, Rob managed to take out €300.- from the group's pot.

Scherp Stellen: Having memorized the 15 photographs required for the assignment beforehand, Rob made sure that the others didn't remember the correct instructions; causing only 4 out of the 15 photographs to be correct at the end of the assignment.

Cijferkunst: Knowing that Nathan as the treasurer would have an influential role at the end of the assignment, Rob avoided pairing up with him. Paired up with Buddy, who wanted to bait Rob into sabotaging, he let Buddy bait him into giving Rik the wrong answer and causing the assignment to fail. It was the moment that Buddy finally locked onto Rob as the Mole, as the group's main suspect Leonie had just been executed from the game.

Richtingsgevoel: Using a voice muffler over a phone, Rob tried to use reverse psychology against Nathan, to no avail. Leading to Nathan reclaiming the money he risked. With Miljuschka, he chose to build trust to bluff her later, however she too didn't fall for his tricks. Eventually, when he got to Buddy he managed to fool him out of €500.-, the eventual total in the assignment led up to €2,500.-, out of a potential €4,500.-.

Hidden Clues
Episode 1 - Afgeschermd: In Beltegoed, Rob made sure to point out the €20.- to indicate that he was the 20th Mole.

Episode 5 - Aangeraakt: The Candidates and audience could have spotted the Mole in Lezen en Schrijven. One of the fans in the park said "The Mole is here" when Rob was on the screen searching.

Episode Titles: The titles throughout the season pointed out to Rob's sabotages, Episode 2 Tegendraads, which translates to contrary, is shown when the wires in Kleur Werk near Rob and Claes were in the contrary direction than where they should have been. Misleid (Mislead) pointed to Rob's role as the Traffic Guide misleading the drivers. Aangeraakt (Touched) had Rob literally touch the letters M, O, L, in that order during the Lettergreep assignment.

Verkeer(d): During the beginning of the assignment, taking the first, second, third, and fourth letters of the first four road signs shown on screen, the letters M, O, L, R would spell out Mol R. A subtle suggestion that Rob was the Mole.

Mol Laser: Rob's confessionals during this assignment were presented as the Mol talking to his opponents. And during his turn in the assignment he called out each of his opponents during the battle.

Episode 6 - Voor Geen Meter: Rik's introduction monologue in this episode made a direct reference to one of Rob's tattoos. "De Mol is tevreden." (The Mole is satisfied.) The words "Tevreden" is tattooed on Rob's shoulder, which is shown throughout the season.

Reception

Viewing Figures

These Viewer ratings included Delayed Viewing.

References

20
2020 Dutch television seasons
Television series impacted by the COVID-19 pandemic
Television shows set in China
Television shows filmed in China